Nuclear. Sad. Nuclear. is the second studio album by American hardcore punk band the Number Twelve Looks Like You. It is their first album on Eyeball Records. The album was released on vinyl on October 23, 2007.

On May 12, 2015 the album was re-released on limited edition, hand numbered cassettes.

Track listing

2005 albums
The Number Twelve Looks Like You albums